This is a list of electoral divisions and wards in the ceremonial county of Isle of Wight in South East England. All changes since the re-organisation of local government following the passing of the Local Government Act 1972 are shown. The number of councillors elected for each electoral division or ward is shown in brackets.

County council

Isle of Wight County Council
Electoral Divisions from 1 April 1974 (first election 12 April 1973) to 7 May 1981:

Electoral Divisions from 7 May 1981 to 4 May 1995:

Isle of Wight Council
Electoral Divisions from 4 May 1995 to 7 June 2001:

Electoral Divisions from 7 June 2001 to 4 June 2009:

Electoral Divisions from 4 June 2009 to 6 May 2021:

Electoral Divisions from 6 May 2021 to present:

Former district councils

Medina
Wards from 1 April 1974 (first election 7 June 1973) to 3 May 1979:

Wards from 3 May 1979 to 1 April 1995 (district abolished):

South Wight
Wards from 1 April 1974 (first election 7 June 1973) to 3 May 1979:

Wards from 3 May 1979 to 1 April 1995 (district abolished):

Electoral divisions by constituency

Isle of Wight
Ashey, Bembridge North, Bembridge South, Binstead, Brading and St Helens, Brighstone and Calbourne, Carisbrooke East, Carisbrooke West, Central Rural, Chale, Niton and Whitwell, Cowes Castle East, Cowes Castle West, Cowes Central,
Cowes Medina, East Cowes North, East Cowes South, Fairlee, Freshwater Afton, Freshwater Norton, Gurnard, Lake North, Lake South, Mount Joy, Newchurch, Newport North, Newport South, Northwood, Osborne, Pan, Parkhurst, Ryde North East, Ryde North West, Ryde South East, Ryde South West, St Johns East, St Johns West, Sandown North, Sandown South, Seaview and Nettlestone, Shalfleet and Yarmouth, Shanklin Central, Shanklin North, Shanklin South, Totland, Ventnor East, Ventnor West, Wootton, Wroxall and Godshill.

References

Politics of the Isle of Wight
Isle Of Wight